Tauranga Intermediate is an Intermediate school situated in Tauranga, New Zealand. It is the largest in the country, with over 1,300 students in 45 classrooms.

Houses
Tauranga Intermediate, since the early days of the school, has had house groups which over the years have changed very much.
 In the 1980s there were four houses:
Matai, Tawa, Rimu and Kauri.
 Sometime in the late 1990s two additional houses were created, these being Totara and Rata. 
 In 2006 3 new houses were created being Miro, Kahikatea and Tanekaha.
 In 2009 A new house Manuka was created.
Miro, Tawa, Totara, Tanekaha, Matai, Kahikatea, Rata, Rimu, Manuka and Kauri.

Every house has 4 classes except for Kahikatea (5 classes) and Matai (6 classes). Each class has about 30-32 students.

Every house has normal classrooms while Rimu, Tanekaha and Miro have 'pods'. They are large classrooms that have all 128 students/4 classes in one room. Each class has a small corner commonly known as their whanau (home) class, but most of the time every class is working together around the whole pod.

Also in 2018, it was announced that Manuka and Totara were getting pods as well, and is estimated to be built/finished in 2020.

Miro, Tawa, Kahikatea, Rata, and Kauri are the normal houses, whilst the houses listed below are different.

Totara house is a CWSA house which stands for Children With Special Abilities. This house is for students who are quite smart and academically focused. To get in you have to sit a test the year prior.

Rimu house is the multimedia house and each student owns a laptop and uses it at school for most of the student's learning. You must apply online the year before. Only a limit of about 64 students per year can be accepted into multimedia.

Matai house is the bilingual house and speak both English and Maori. Their classes are based on their Maori vocabulary instead on age.

About 5-10 students who enrol to Tauranga Intermediate School are special needs kids, and are usually transported to and from the school grounds to Tauranga Special Needs. These students are put into Manuka house.

In 2018, Tanekaha became a second multimedia house, letting about 64 more students into multimedia (giving 128 students the opportunity each year).

House Colours:

Miro (Orange) 
Tawa (Dark Blue) 
Totara (Purple) 
Tanekaha (Light Blue) 
Matai (Yellow) 
Kahikatea (Light Green) 
Rata (Black) 
Rimu (Red) 
Kauri (Dark Green) 
Manuka (Pink)

Facilities
There are 7 different facilities that every student gets to go to during their 2 years of attending Tauranga Intermediate:
 Art
 Soft Material (Sewing)
 Hard Material (Creating wooden objects using tools and saws, sometimes you get to use metal)
 Food Technology (Cooking)
 Digital Technology (Coding, 3D printing, robotics)
 Science
 Music
You would be split into 3 groups (year 7's) or 4 groups (year 8's) named 7A, 7B, 7C, (year 7s) and 8A, 8B, 8C, 8D (year 8s), and these groups would be created within your house. About 21 year 7s will be in a group, and 16 year 8s in a group.

Every term you will have 2 technology rotations, but one term you will only have 1.

You will get 5 lessons across 5 days per rotation. But 1 term you will only have 4 lessons per rotation, which is usually term 3, the term of the AIMS Games

Teachers
In 1993, Mr. Brian Diver became principal of Tauranga Intermediate School, but at the end of Term 1 in 2019, he resigned and was replaced by deputy principal Mr. Cameron Mitchell. Mr. Mitchell's old place of deputy principal was replaced by Mr. Arthur, who has worked as deputy principal years before.

External links
 Tauranga Intermediate's school website
 Kaka Street Intermediate Satellite Class webpage
 AIMS Games

References

Educational institutions established in 1958
Intermediate schools in New Zealand
Schools in Tauranga
1958 establishments in New Zealand